Timothy John Cramsey (born October 8, 1975) is an American football coach and former player. He is currently the offensive coordinator and quarterbacks coach at Memphis University after previously serving in the same role at Marshall University.

Coaching career

High School coaching
Cramsey got his coaching start, in 2001, as an assistant coach at his high school alma mater, Allentown Central Catholic High School in Allentown, Pennsylvania.

In 2002, he moved to Emmaus High School in Emmaus, Pennsylvania, as an assistant.

New Hampshire
In 2003, Cramsey returned to his college alma mater, the University of New Hampshire, as the tight ends and fullbacks coach. He held that position from 2003-2005, coached the running backs in 2006 and 2007, moved to quarterbacks in 2008. Prior to the 2009 season, Head Coach Sean McDonnell promoted Cramsey to offensive coordinator. He also continued coaching the quarterbacks through the 2011 season.

Florida International University
From there, Cramsey moved to Florida International University as the offensive coordinator and quarterbacks coach for the 2012 season.

Montana State
From 2013 to 2015, he served in the same role at Montana State University.

Nevada
In 2016, Cramsey jumped back to the FBS level, serving as the offensive coordinator for the Nevada Wolf Pack.

Sam Houston State
In 2017, he served as the offensive coordinator and quarterbacks coach at Sam Houston State University.

Marshall
On January 31, 2018, Head Coach Doc Holliday announced that Cramsey would join the Marshall coaching staff as the offensive coordinator and quarterbacks coach. In 2021 he was retained by Charles Huff as the team's offensive coordinator.

Memphis
In January of 2022, Cramsey left Marshall for Memphis to be Ryan Silverfield's new offensive coordinator and quarterbacks coach.

Playing career
Cramsey played quarterback for the New Hampshire Wildcats from 1994 to 1997. He was a two-year starter and four-year letter winner for head coach Bill Bowes.

Personal life
The Allentown, Pennsylvania, native attended Allentown Central Catholic High School, where he quarterbacked the football team to their first ever state championship. He and his wife, Amy, have two sons, Brock, and Bryce.

References

1975 births
Living people
American football quarterbacks
FIU Panthers football coaches
Marshall Thundering Herd football coaches
Montana State Bobcats football coaches
Nevada Wolf Pack football coaches
New Hampshire Wildcats football coaches
New Hampshire Wildcats football players
Sam Houston Bearkats football coaches
Sportspeople from Allentown, Pennsylvania